Yoendris Salazar (born 7 August 1977) is a Cuban diver. He competed in the men's 3 metre springboard event at the 2000 Summer Olympics.

References

1977 births
Living people
Cuban male divers
Olympic divers of Cuba
Divers at the 2000 Summer Olympics
Place of birth missing (living people)